Wildcat Creek may refer to:
 Wildcat Creek (California)
 Wildcat Creek (Indiana)
 Wildcat Creek (Kansas River tributary), a stream in Kansas
 Wildcat Creek (Munkers Creek tributary), a stream in Kansas
 Wildcat Creek (West Branch Whitewater River tributary), a stream in Kansas
 Wildcat Creek, Kentucky, a tributary of Goose Creek (Oneida, Kentucky)
 Wildcat Creek (Minnesota)
 Wildcat Creek (Grand River), a stream in Missouri
 Wildcat Creek (Wachita Creek), a stream in Missouri
 Wildcat Creek (Lackawanna River), in Lackawanna County, Pennsylvania
 Wildcat Creek (Siuslaw River), Lane County, Oregon
 Wildcat Creek (Beaver County, Utah)